The 1979 NBA draft was the 33rd annual draft of the National Basketball Association (NBA), held at the Plaza Hotel in New York City on Monday, June 25. In this draft, the 22 NBA teams took turns selecting amateur U.S. college basketball players and other eligible players, including international players; it went ten rounds and selected 202 players.

The first two picks in the draft belonged to the teams that finished last in each conference, with the order determined by a coin flip. The Los Angeles Lakers, who obtained the New Orleans Jazz' first-round pick in a trade, won the coin flip and were awarded the first overall pick, while the Chicago Bulls were awarded the second pick. The remaining first-round picks and the subsequent rounds were assigned to teams in reverse order of their win–loss record in the previous season. A player who had finished his four-year college eligibility was eligible for selection.

If a player left college early, he would not be eligible for selection until his college class graduated. Larry Bird would have been eligible to join this draft class because his "junior eligible" draft status from being taken by Boston in 1978 would expire the minute the 1979 draft began, but Bird and the Celtics agreed on a five-year contract on June 8 to avoid that. Before the draft, five college underclassmen were declared eligible for selection under the "hardship" rule. These players had applied and gave evidence of financial hardship to the league, which granted them the right to start earning their living by starting their professional careers earlier. Prior to the draft, the Jazz relocated from New Orleans to Salt Lake City and became the Utah Jazz.

Draft selections and draftee career notes
Magic Johnson from NCAA champion Michigan State University, one of the "hardship" players, was selected first overall by the Los Angeles Lakers. Johnson, who had just finished his sophomore season in college, became the first underclassman to be drafted first overall. He went on to win the NBA championship with the Lakers in his rookie season. He also won the Finals Most Valuable Player Award, becoming the first rookie ever to win the award. He spent his entire 13-year career with the Lakers and won five NBA championships. He also won three Most Valuable Player Awards, three Finals Most Valuable Player Awards, ten consecutive All-NBA Team selections and twelve All-Star Game selections. For his achievements, he has been inducted to the Basketball Hall of Fame. He was also named to the list of the 50 Greatest Players in NBA History announced at the league's 50th anniversary in 1996.

Sidney Moncrief, the fifth pick, won two Defensive Player of the Year Awards and was selected to five consecutive All-NBA Teams, five consecutive All-Defensive Teams and  five consecutive All-Star Games. In "The Book of Basketball", Bill Simmons noted that then-Lakers head coach Jerry West had actually wanted to trade down from the #1 pick and use it to get Moncrief along with more players and picks, but Jerry Buss vetoed West's plans because Buss wanted Magic to be the new face of the team he was just finishing his full purchase of. Jim Paxson, the twelfth pick, was selected to one All-NBA Team and two All-Star Games. Bill Cartwright, the third pick, won three consecutive NBA championships with the Chicago Bulls from  through . He also had one All-Star Game selection, which occurred in his rookie season. He then became the Bulls' head coach for three seasons. After retiring, he coached the Detroit Shock of the Women's National Basketball Association (WNBA) for eight seasons, leading them to three WNBA championships in 2003, 2006 and 2008. Mark Eaton, who had only completed one year of college basketball, was selected by the Phoenix Suns with the 107th pick. During his eleven-year career with the Jazz, he won two Defensive Player of the Year Awards and was selected to five consecutive All-Defensive Team and one All-Star Game. Two other players from this draft, eighth pick Calvin Natt and 73rd pick James Donaldson, were also selected to one All-Star Game each.

In the fourth round, the Boston Celtics selected Nick Galis from Seton Hall University with the 68th pick. However, he suffered a serious injury in the training camp and was waived by the Celtics before the season started. Galis, who was born in the United States to Greek parents, opted to play in Greece. He never played in the NBA and spent all of his professional career in Greece, where he helped the country emerge as an international basketball power. He won a Eurobasket title, 8 Greek championships, 7 Greek cups as well as numerous personal honors and awards. He has been inducted into both the FIBA Hall of Fame and the Naismith Memorial Basketball Hall of Fame.

Draft

Other picks
The following list includes other draft picks who have appeared in at least one NBA game or have been inducted to the Naismith Memorial Basketball Hall of Fame.

Notable undrafted players
These players were not selected in the 1979 draft but played at least one game in the NBA.

Trades
 On August 5, 1976, the Los Angeles Lakers acquired 1977, 1978 and 1979 first-round picks, and a 1980 second-round pick from the New Orleans Jazz in exchange for a 1978 first-round pick and a 1977 second-round pick. This trade was arranged as compensation when the Jazz signed Gail Goodrich on July 19, 1976. The Lakers used the pick to draft Magic Johnson.
 On February 12, 1979, the New York Knicks acquired three first-round picks from the Boston Celtics in exchange for Bob McAdoo. Previously, the Celtics acquired a first-round pick on January 30, 1979, from the Golden State Warriors in exchange for Jo Jo White. The Celtics also acquired a first-round pick on January 17, 1979, from the Seattle SuperSonics in exchange for Dennis Awtrey. The Knicks used the picks to draft Bill Cartwright, Larry Demic and Sly Williams.
 On the draft-day, the Detroit Pistons acquired the fifth pick from the Milwaukee Bucks in exchange for the sixth pick and cash considerations. Previously, the Bucks acquired the pick from the Cleveland Cavaliers on June 1, 1978, in exchange for a 1978 first-round pick. The Pistons used the pick to draft Greg Kelser. The Bucks used the pick to draft Sidney Moncrief
 On October 24, 1975, the Seattle SuperSonics acquired Gene Short and a first-round pick from the New York Knicks in exchange for Spencer Haywood. The Sonics used the pick to draft James Bailey.
 On October 4, 1978, the Seattle SuperSonics acquired Lonnie Shelton and a 1979 first-round pick from the New York Knicks in exchange for a 1981 first-round pick. This trade was arranged as compensation when the Knicks signed Marvin Webster on September 29, 1978. Previously, the Knicks acquired the 1978 and 1979 first-round picks on June 8, 1978, from the New Jersey Nets in exchange for Phil Jackson, a 1978 first-round pick and US$3.2-million settlement of their indemnification debt to the Knicks. The Sonics used the pick to draft Vinnie Johnson.
 On May 31, 1979, the New Jersey Nets acquired John Gianelli and the eighth pick from the Milwaukee Bucks in exchange for Harvey Catchings. Previously, the Bucks acquired the pick on June 8, 1978, from the Indiana Pacers as compensation for the signing of Alex English as a free agent. The Nets used the pick to draft Calvin Natt.
 On November 23, 1977, the Detroit Pistons acquired Gus Gerard, John Shumate and 1979 first-round pick from the San Diego Clippers in exchange for Marvin Barnes, a 1978 second-round pick and a 1978 fourth-round pick. Previously, the Clippers acquired the pick on September 2, 1977, from the Milwaukee Bucks in exchange for John Gianelli. The Pistons used the pick to draft Roy Hamilton.
 On September 1, 1977, the New Jersey Nets acquired George E. Johnson, 1978 and 1979 first-round picks from the San Diego Clippers in exchange for Nate Archibald. The Nets used the pick to draft Cliff Robinson.
 On June 9, 1978, the Indiana Pacers acquired a first-round pick from the Atlanta Hawks as compensation for the signing of Dan Roundfield as a free agent. The Pacers used the pick to draft Dudley Bradley.
 On February 1, 1978, the Detroit Pistons acquired Jim Price and a first-round pick from the Denver Nuggets in exchange for Ralph Simpson. The Pistons used the pick to draft Phil Hubbard.
 On January 12, 1979, the Utah Jazz acquired Marty Byrnes, Ron Lee, 1979 and 1980 first-round picks from the Phoenix Suns in exchange for Truck Robinson. The Jazz used the pick to draft Larry Knight.
 On June 22, 1979, the Phoenix Suns acquired the 22nd pick and a 1980 third-round pick from the Washington Bullets in exchange for Steve Malovic. The Suns used the pick to draft Kyle Macy.
 On October 11, 1978, the Phoenix Suns acquired a second-round pick from the Boston Celtics in exchange for Dennis Awtrey. The Suns used the pick to draft Johnny High.

Early entrants

College underclassmen
The following college basketball players successfully applied for early draft entrance.

  Garcia Hopkins – F, Morgan State (sophomore)
  Magic Johnson – G, Michigan State (sophomore)
  Cliff Robinson – F, USC (sophomore)
  Sly Williams – F/G, Rhode Island (junior)

Notes

See also
 List of first overall NBA draft picks

References
General

Specific

External links
NBA.com
NBA.com: NBA Draft History

Draft
National Basketball Association draft
NBA draft
NBA draft
1970s in Manhattan
Basketball in New York City
Sporting events in New York City
Sports in Manhattan